Dwight Eli (born 11 November 1982) is a Dutch former footballer who played for Sparta Rotterdam in the Eredivisie and Eerste Divisie.

Club career
Eli made his professional debut in the Eredivisie, on 28 April 2002 for Sparta under coach Frank Rijkaard against PSV. On 5 May that year he played a home game against FC Groningen. Next season, in the Eerste Divisie, he played 16 matches.

Eli continued his career with a long spell at the amateur branch of Feyenoord, SC Feyenoord. He finished his player career at TOGB and RSCV Zestienhoven.

References

External links

1982 births
Living people
Dutch sportspeople of Surinamese descent
Footballers from Rotterdam
Association football defenders
Dutch footballers
Zwart-Wit '28 players
Sparta Rotterdam players
Eredivisie players
Eerste Divisie players
SC Feyenoord players
TOGB players